Peristoreus flavitarsis is a species of true weevil. It is endemic to New Zealand. The larvae are leaf miners of Podocarpus totara. Similar leaf mines have also been found on Podocarpus acutifolius and Podocarpus cunninghamii.

P. flavitarsis was originally named Erirhinus flavitarsis by Broun in 1880. Then, in 1926, Marshall described a new genus called Dorytomodes, into which he provisionally transferred all species placed by Broun in Erirrhinus [=Erirhinus]. Dorytomodes was subsequently sunk as a synonym of Peristoreus by Edward S. ("Ted") Gourlay in 1950.

P. flavitarsis has been reported from North Island localities, including Parua (type locality) and Huia.

References

External links
 NatureWatch NZ

Beetles of New Zealand
Curculioninae
Beetles described in 1880
Endemic insects of New Zealand
Endemic fauna of New Zealand